Anim or ANIM may refer to:

Places 
A city in the mountains of Judah, now el-Ghuwein, near Eshtemoh, about 10 miles south-west of Hebron
An alternative spelling for the biblical city of Anem, now Jenin
 Anim synagogue, a synagogue in Israel

People 
Cecilia Anim, president of the Royal College of Nursing
Vida Anim (born 1983), Ghanaian athlete

Other uses 
Animation
ANIM, a file format used to store digital movies and computer generated animations
Anim languages, a language group of New Guinea
Anim Publishing, an imprint of the German group VDM Publishing, devoted to the reproduction of Wikipedia content
Afghanistan National Institute of Music

See also 
 Anem (disambiguation)